The 2014–15 Segunda División de Futsal season is the 22nd season of second-tier futsal in Spain since its inception in 1993.

The season comprises regular season and promotion playoff. Regular season begun on September 20, 2014 and finished on April 18, 2015. After finishing regular season, top four teams play promotion playoff to Primera División while the bottom team is relegated Segunda División B.

Promotion playoff will begin on April 25, playing semifinals and Final to the best of 3 matches. Winner of promotion playoff will be promoted to Primera División 2015–16.

Teams

Regular season standings

Promotion playoffs

Calendar

Bracket

1st round

1st match

2nd match

Final

1st match

2nd match

 Brihuega won series 2–0 and promoted to Primera División.

Top scorers

See also
2014–15 Primera División de Futsal
2014–15 Copa del Rey de Futsal
Segunda División B de Futsal

References

External links
2014–15 results at lnfs.es
2014–15 standings at lnfs.es
2014–15 promotion playoff at lnfs.es

2014–15 in Spanish futsal
Futsal2
Segunda División de Futsal seasons